The Civil Aviation Authority (CAA) of the Republic of Poland (ULC), as a civil aviation authority, is an agency of the Polish government under the Ministry of Infrastructure and Development responsible for implementing policies on civil aviation to assure safe, economic and efficient air travel.
The Civil Aviation Authority is responsible for providing and maintaining safe and efficient aviation services to, from and within Poland.
The President of the CAA performs functions of aviation administration and aviation supervision authority in the following areas among others: 
 compliance with legal provisions relating to the civil aviation & commercial aviation,
 operation of aircraft & certification of entities conducting activity in civil aviation, 
 airworthiness of aeronautical equipment & the competency of the flight personnel, 
 registers of: aircraft, aerodromes, aviation ground facilities, flight personnel, & landing areas, 
 co-operation with the authorities to which the state aviation is subordinated & with other organisational units in air traffic management & in ensuring air traffic safety & services, 
 co-operation with the aviation administration & supervision authorities of foreign states, local government authorities in matters related to civil aviation, ICAO & other international civil aviation organisations, 
 flight safety in civil aviation, including the examination & evaluation of safety levels in civil aviation, 
 application of civil aviation regulations, 
 approving the boundaries of manoeuvring area of the aerodrome, 
 international agreements - preparation & negotiations, legislative acts in civil aviation 
 National Civil Aviation Security Programme & National Civil Aviation Facilitation Programme -designing & direct supervision over its implementation, 
 aerodrome security protection programs & security protection programs provided by entities conducting commercial activities in civil aviation & supervising implementation of such programs, 
 organisation of aviation medical examination services, 
co-ordination of local town & country plans in municipalities where a new aerodrome location is projected or an existing aerodrome & ground aviation facilities are to be modernised. 
 protect a passengers’ right 
The President of the CAA may authorise other authorities or specialised organisational units or persons having the relevant licences or certificates of competency entitling holder to exercise the privilege to perform certain supervision or control operations. (art. 22 par 3 of the Aviation Act adopted on July 3, 2002 & published on August 16th 2002 (Journal of Laws No 130 pos. 1112)

Notes

Government agencies of Poland
Poland
Civil aviation in Poland
Aviation organisations based in Poland